Hendrik Jan (Hein) Rutten meergenaamd Roethof (23 November 1921, in Utrecht – 15 January 1996, in Utrecht) was a Dutch journalist and politician.

He completed his secondary education at the Utrecht HBS. Roethof read Law of the Dutch East Indies at Utrecht University from 1940 to 1945, from which he received his PhD in 1951.

After the Second World War he moved to the Dutch East Indies, where he was a civil servant from October 1945 to March 1946. He then worked for two years at the Government Information Service in Batavia. In 1948 he turned to journalism and was an assistant editor-in-chief of a newspaper for half a year. He then returned to the Netherlands to work at Dutch newspaper Nieuwe Rotterdamsche Courant. From 1951 to 1958 he was editor for Dutch news and from 1964 parliamentary editor.

Beside his work he was chairman of JOVD, the youth section of Dutch conservative-liberal party VVD. Because of his progressive political ideas he broke away from the VVD and in 1964 he joined the social-democratic PvdA.

From February 1964 Roethof worked at the Dutch Ministry of Foreign Affairs, until he was elected as a PvdA MP in the House of Representatives of the Netherlands in 1969. He would remain an MP until 1989, with a break from 1982 to 1986. He was specialised in matters of law, law enforcement and media. He also worked on international law, workers' rights to strike and the legal position of civil servants.

External links

Members of the House of Representatives (Netherlands)
People's Party for Freedom and Democracy politicians
Labour Party (Netherlands) politicians
Dutch civil servants
Dutch humanists
Utrecht University alumni
Politicians from Utrecht (city)
1921 births
1996 deaths
20th-century Dutch journalists
Dutch people of the Dutch East Indies